CKWE-FM is a First Nation community radio station that operates at 103.9 MHz (FM) in Maniwaki, Quebec, Canada.

Owned by the Kitigan Zibi Anishinabeg First Nation, the station received CRTC approval in 1986.

References

External links
www.ckwe1039.fm
 

Kwe
Kwe
Radio stations established in 1986
1986 establishments in Quebec